Rabdophaga salicisbrassicoides, known generally as the willow rosette gall midge or willow cabbage gall midge, is a species of gall midges in the family Cecidomyiidae. Their galls and larvae thrive in association with the  mutualistic relationship between Formica neoclara and Chaitophorus aphids found on their host species Salix exigua. The larva overwinter in their galls, and adults emerge in late April.

References

Further reading

 
 

salicisbrassicoides
Articles created by Qbugbot
Insects described in 1869
Gall-inducing insects
Willow galls